Prauserella coralliicola is a Gram-positive bacterium from the genus Prauserella which has been isolated from the coral Galaxea fascicularis from the Luhuitou fringing reef in China.

References

Pseudonocardiales
Bacteria described in 2014